Veronica's Closet is an American television sitcom created by David Crane and Marta Kauffman, that aired on NBC for three seasons, from September 25, 1997, to December 7, 2000. The show stars Kirstie Alley as Veronica "Ronnie" Chase, the head of her own lingerie company in New York City.

Overview
Veronica  'Ronnie' Chase, played by Alley, has made a living being known as the "Queen of Romance". She is the owner of Veronica's Closet, a company that sells lingerie and other bedroom accessories. Her husband Bryce, played by Christopher McDonald, regularly cheats on her, though she always takes him back because of the image she has created. However, after another tryst, Veronica decides to leave him and begins her life as a single woman.

She is championed by her best friend and Chief Financial Officer Olive Massery, played by Kathy Najimy, and her father Pat Chase, played by Robert Prosky, who is also her chauffeur. She also works with Perry Rollins, played by Dan Cortese, a former thong model who is her publicist; her assistant Josh Blair, played by Wallace Langham, and Leo Michaels, played by Darryl 'Chill' Mitchell. Later in the first season, she gets a silent partner in Millicent, played by Holland Taylor. However, when Millicent dies, the company is taken over by Millicent's incompetent son.

During the second season. Millicent's ex-husband, Alec Bilson, played by Ron Silver, takes the company from his former step-son and helps the company regain some financial ground. However, he and Ronnie get closer, romantically, as the season progresses. He dies between seasons two and three and is revealed to have married someone else. His widow, June Bilson, played by Lorri Bagley, is a stereotypical dumb blonde who has some secret intelligence. She remodels the entire office and refuses to give up her share of the company until Olive buys her out in the series finale.

Cast

Main

Recurring
 Mary Lynn Rajskub as Chloe (15 episodes)
 Cynthia Mann as Virginia/Receptionist (14 episodes)
 Christopher McDonald as Bryce Anderson (9 episodes), Ronnie's ex-husband
 Ever Carradine as Pepper (8 episodes)
 Tamala Jones as Tina (8 episodes)
 Alan F. Smith as Brian (7 episodes)
 David Starzyk as Pete (5 episodes)
 Lupe Ontiveros as Louisa (4 episodes)
 James Wilder as Hunter (3 episodes)
 Erica Shaffer as Waitress/Assistant (3 episodes)
 Mark Harelik as Paul Byrne (3 episodes)
 John Schneider as Tom (3 episodes)
 John Mariano as Chris (3 episodes)
 Holland Taylor as Millicent (2 episodes)
 Jay Leno as himself (2 episodes)
 Scott Baio as Kevin (2 episodes)

Guest stars
 Eric McCormack as Griffin 
 Ted Danson as Nick Vanover
 Michael Jeter as Edwin Murloff
 Conan O'Brien as himself
 Portia de Rossi as Carolyn
 Leeza Gibbons as herself
 Ingo Rademacher as Reg
 Zooey Deschanel as Elena
 Tia Carrere as Kim
 Tom Arnold as Chris
 John Ritter as Tim
 RuPaul as Brett
 Anna Nicole Smith as Donna

History 
The series premiered on September 25, 1997, after Seinfeld, to 35 million viewers. Its title was derived from the “real life” lingerie company, Victoria's Secret. Hammocked between Seinfeld and ER within the Must See TV lineup, the show was a top 10 hit, although the initial ratings died down later in the first season. The sitcom spent the first two seasons on Thursdays at 9:30 (after Seinfeld in season 1 and after Frasier in season 2).

NBC moved the show out of Must See TV to a new time slot, following Suddenly Susan (another NBC sitcom centered around a professional single woman), on Mondays for the 1999–2000 season. Ratings fell more than 50 percent, and NBC put both shows on hiatus. The show returned on Tuesdays at 9:30 (after Will & Grace) with only a slight boost in ratings. NBC canceled the series in 2000, along with Suddenly Susan, due to low ratings. Reruns were shown on USA Network from 2000 to early 2003 and on TV Guide Network from 2011 to 2012.

The show was taped Warner Bros. Studios in Burbank, California, on soundstage 25.

Episodes

Series overview

Season 1 (1997–1998)

Season 2 (1998–1999)

Season 3 (1999–2000)

Broadcast and ratings history

Accolades 

The series received recognition from the Hollywood Foreign Press Association, the Academy of Television Arts & Sciences, and the Screen Actors Guild-American Federation of Television and Radio Arts among other associations.

References

External links 
 
 
 Jump The Shark - Veronica's Closet

NBC original programming
1990s American sitcoms
1990s American workplace comedy television series
1997 American television series debuts
2000 American television series endings
2000s American sitcoms
2000s American workplace comedy television series
English-language television shows
Fashion-themed television series
Television series by Warner Bros. Television Studios
Television series created by David Crane (producer)
Television series created by Marta Kauffman
Television shows set in New York City